Joseph Gabriel Pinten (October 3, 1867 – November 6, 1945) was an American prelate of the Roman Catholic Church.  He served as the third bishop of the Diocese of Superior in Wisconsin (1922–1926), and as the fourth bishop of the Diocese of Grand Rapids in Michigan (1926–1940).

Biography

Early years 
Joseph Pinten was born in Rockland, Michigan, the son of Joseph and Anna Pinten.  He  grew up in Calumet, Michigan. In 1881, he entered Saint Francis de Sales Seminary in St. Francis, Wisconsin.  Pinten traveled to Rome in 1885 to attend the Propaganda Fide University in Rome.

Priesthood 
Pinten was ordained to the priesthood by Cardinal Lucido Parocchi on November 1, 1890 at Trinità dei Monti Church in Rome for the Diocese of Sault Sainte Marie-Marquette. After returning to Michigan, Pinten was assigned as an assistant pastor at St. Paul's Parish in Negaunee, Michigan in 1892 and then assistant pastor of St. Fidelis Parish in Detour, Michigan.  Pinten spent 1893 on medical leave, then had the following parish assignments:

 Administrator at St Fidelis (1894)
 Pastor at Holy Rosary (Assumption) in Iron Mountain (1894 to 1895) 
 Pastor at St. Barbara's in Vulcan (1895 to 1898)
 Pastor at St. Joseph's in L'Anse (1898)
 Rector at St. Peter's Cathedral (1899)

In 1912, Pinten was named vicar general of the diocese. Later that year Pope Pius X designated him as a domestic prelate, with the honorific title of monsignor. He directed the construction of Holy Family Orphan's Home in Marquette, and headed the orphanage from 1916 to 1922. In 1919, Pinten used his own funds to purchase the dormitory property of Northern Normal College in Marquette, Michigan. Pinten then donated it to the diocese to use as a church, requiring it be named Saint Michael and that it would have a parish school.

Bishop of Superior
On November 30, 1921, Pope Benedict XV appointed Pinten as the third bishop of the Diocese of Superior. He was ordained bishop on May 3, 1922 at St. Peter Cathedral with Archbishop Sebastian Messmer presiding. The next day, an enthronement ceremony was held at Sacred Heart pro-cathedral in Superior, Wisconsin.

After his arrival in Superior, Pinten purchased a home for himself. When he learned that a local community of sisters was living in an overcrowded residence, he remodeled the house and quietly turned it over to them. He oversaw numerous building and expansion projects throughout the diocese.

Ground breaking for the new cathedral began on June 23, 1926. In his last act as bishop of Superior, Pinten blessed and laid the cornerstone for the Cathedral of Christ the King in Superior on October 24, 1926. The next day he left for his new appointment at Grand Rapids.

Bishop of Grand Rapids

On June 25, 1926, Pope Pius XI appointed Pinten as the fourth bishop of the Diocese of Grand Rapids. He was installed there on October 28, 1926.

Death and legacy 
On November 1, 1940, Pope Pius XII accepted Pinten's resignation as bishop of the Diocese of Superior and appointed him as titular bishop of Sela.  In poor health after his retirement, Joseph Pinter moved back to Marquette, Michigan where he died at St. Mary's Hospital on November 6, 1945.

See also

 Catholic Church hierarchy
 Catholic Church in the United States
 Historical list of the Catholic bishops of the United States
 List of Catholic bishops of the United States
 Lists of patriarchs, archbishops, and bishops

References

External links
 GCatholic Reference, Diocese of Superior, list of Bishops 
 GCatholic Reference, Diocese of Grand Rapids, list of Bishops 
 Roman Catholic Diocese of Grand Rapids 
 Roman Catholic Diocese of Superior

1867 births
1945 deaths
20th-century Roman Catholic bishops in the United States
People from Ontonagon County, Michigan
People from Marquette, Michigan
Religious leaders from Wisconsin
Roman Catholic bishops of Grand Rapids
Roman Catholic bishops of Superior